Acraga flava is a moth of the family Dalceridae. It is found in southern Brazil and northern Argentina. The habitat consists of tropical premontane moist, subtropical wet, subtropical moist, subtropical lower montane wet, subtropical lower montane moist and warm temperate moist forests.

The length of the forewings is 12–13 mm for males and 14–19 mm for females. The forewings are bright golden yellow with a metallic luster. The scales are patterned to appear as undulating transverse bands. The hindwings are pale yellow. Adults are on wing year-round.

The larvae feed on Nectandra, Psidium guajava and Prunus domestica.

References

Dalceridae
Moths described in 1855